Gulestan Rustom Billimoria was an Indian philanthropist, social worker, writer and painter, best known for her services for the special needs children of Mumbai. She served as the Sheriff of Mumbai in 1957 and was the lady superintendent of The Alexandra Girls’ English Institution, Mumbai from 1922 to 1937.

Born Gulestan J. Bhadurjee, Billimoria did her schooling at Girton High School and college studies at St. Xavier's College, Mumbai during which period she was a fellow of the University of Mumbai for two terms and a member of the university senate. After her marriage to Rustomji Bomanji Billimoria, the founder of Bel-Air Hospital of Indian Red Cross Society and a Padma Bhushan recipient, she took over the management of the functions of the hospital. Later, she helped found the Savera Special School Gulestan And Billimoria School, Mumbai of the Maharashtra State Women's Council, an institution for the mentally and physically handicapped children.

Billimoria was a known painter and one of her paintings has been exhibited at the Prince of Wales Museum, Mumbai (present-day Chhatrapati Shivaji Maharaj Vastu Sangrahalaya. She also wrote a number of articles on special needs children. The Government of India awarded her the Padma Bhushan, the third highest civilian award, in 1972. Gulestan and Rustom Billimoria Endowment Lecture is an annual event organized in her honor.

References

Further reading

External links
 
 

Recipients of the Padma Bhushan in social work
Indian women essayists
Social workers
Indian philanthropists
Year of birth missing
Year of death missing
Sheriffs of Mumbai
St. Xavier's College, Mumbai alumni
Painters from Maharashtra
Writers from Mumbai
Social workers from Maharashtra
Scholars from Mumbai
Women writers from Maharashtra
20th-century Indian women writers
20th-century Indian essayists
Women educators from Maharashtra
Indian women painters
20th-century Indian painters
20th-century Indian women artists
Women artists from Maharashtra
Parsi people from Mumbai